Absorption is a valid argument form and rule of inference of propositional logic. The rule makes it possible to introduce conjunctions to proofs. It is called the law of absorption because the term  is "absorbed" by the term  in the consequent. The rule can be stated:

where the rule is that wherever an instance of "" appears on a line of a proof, "" can be placed on a subsequent line.

Formal notation 
The absorption rule may be expressed as a sequent:

 

and expressed as a truth-functional tautology or theorem of propositional logic. The principle was stated as a theorem of propositional logic by Russell and Whitehead in  Principia Mathematica as:

Examples
If it will rain, then I will wear my coat.
Therefore, if it will rain then it will rain and I will wear my coat.

Proof by truth table

Formal proof

See also
Absorption law

References

Rules of inference
Theorems in propositional logic